The Men's 50 metre freestyle S7 event at the 2016 Paralympic Games took place on 9 September 2016, at the Olympic Aquatics Stadium. Two heats were held. The swimmers with the eight fastest times advanced to the final.

Heats

Heat 1 
9:42 9 September 2016:

Heat 2 
9:45 9 September 2016:

Final 
17:59 9 September 2016:

Notes

Swimming at the 2016 Summer Paralympics